The Palestine pound (or ; Sign: £P) was the currency of the British Mandate of Palestine from 1 November 1927 to 14 May 1948, and of the State of Israel between 15 May 1948 and 23 June 1952, when it was replaced with the Israeli lira.  The Palestine pound was also the currency of Transjordan until 1949 when it was replaced by the Jordanian dinar, and remained in usage in the West Bank of Jordan until 1950. In the Gaza Strip, the Palestine pound continued to circulate until April 1951, when it was replaced by the Egyptian pound.

History
Until 1918, Palestine was an integral part of the Ottoman Empire and therefore used its currency, the Ottoman lira. During 1917 and 1918, Palestine was occupied by the British army, who set up a military administration. The official currency was the Egyptian pound, which had been first introduced into Egypt in 1834, but several other currencies were legal tender at fixed exchange rates that were vigorously enforced. After the establishment of a civil administration in 1921, the High Commissioner Herbert Samuel ordered that from 22 January 1921 only Egyptian currency and the British gold sovereign would be legal tender.

In 1926, the British Secretary of State for the Colonies appointed a Palestine Currency Board to introduce a local currency. It was based in London and chaired by P. G. Ezechiel, with a Currency Officer resident in Palestine. The board decided that the new currency would be called the Palestine pound, 1:1 with sterling and divided into 1,000 mils. The £P1 gold coin would contain 123.27447 grains of standard gold. The enabling legislation was the Palestine Currency Order, 1927, signed by the King in February 1927. The Palestine pound became legal tender on 1 November 1927. The Egyptian pound (at the fixed rate of £P1 = £E0.975) and the British gold sovereign remained legal tender until 1 March 1928.

The Palestine Currency Order explicitly excluded Transjordan from its application, but the Government of Transjordan decided to adopt the Palestine pound at the same time as Palestine did. The Egyptian pound remained legal tender in Transjordan until 1930.

All the denominations were trilingual in Arabic, English and Hebrew. The Hebrew inscription included after "Palestina" the initials Aleph Yud, for "Eretz Yisrael" (Land of Israel).

The Currency Board was dissolved in May 1948, with the end of the British Mandate, but the Palestinian pound continued in circulation for transitional periods:
 
 Israel adopted the Israeli lira in 1952. In August 1948, new banknotes were issued by the Anglo-Palestine Bank, owned by the Jewish Agency and based in London.
 Jordan adopted the Jordanian dinar in 1949.
 In the West Bank, the Palestine pound continued to circulate until 1950, when the West Bank was annexed by Jordan, and the Jordanian dinar became legal tender there. The Jordanian dinar is still legal tender in the West Bank along with the Israeli shekel.
 In the Gaza Strip, the Palestine pound continued to circulate until April 1951, when it was replaced by the Egyptian pound, three years after the Egyptian army took control of the territory.

Since the mid-1980s, the primary currencies used in the West Bank have been the shekel and the Jordanian dinar. The shekel is used for most transactions, especially retail, while the dinar is used more for savings and durable goods transactions. The US dollar is also sometimes used for savings and for purchasing foreign goods. The dollar is used by the overwhelming majority of transactions overseen by the Palestinian Monetary Authority (Palestine's nascent central bank), which only represent a fraction of all transactions conducted in Palestine or by Palestinians.

The shekel is the main currency in Gaza. Under Egyptian rule (1948–1956), Gaza mainly used the Egyptian pound. When Israel occupied the Gaza Strip during the 1956 Suez Crisis, the military administration made the Israeli lira (the predecessor to the shekel) the only legal currency in Gaza in a 3 December decree, and implemented a favorable exchange rate to remove all Egyptian pounds from circulation. As a result, the lira and then the shekel became the dominant currency in Gaza, a situation that was reinforced in 1967 by the Israeli occupation of Gaza following the Six-Day War.

Under Article IV of the Protocol on Economic Relations, the Palestinians are not allowed to independently introduce a separate  Palestinian currency. At the same time, the use of two currencies increases the costs and inconvenience arising from fluctuating exchange rates.

Coins
In 1927, coins were introduced in denominations of 1, 2, 5, 10, 20, 50 and 100 mils. The 1 and 2 mil were struck in bronze, whilst the 5, 10 and 20 mil were holed, cupro-nickel coins, except for during World War II, when they were also minted in bronze. The coin of 10 mils was also called a grush. The 50 and 100 mil coins were struck in .720 silver.

The last coins were issued for circulation in 1946, with all 1947 dated coins being melted down.

Banknotes
On 1 November 1927, banknotes were introduced by the Palestine Currency Board in denominations of 500 mils, £P1, £P5, £P10, £P50 and £P100. Notes were issued with dates as late as 15 August 1945.

The £P100 note was equivalent to 40 months’ wages of a skilled worker in Palestine. At the end of 1947, five months before the end of the British Mandate, there were 1,590 £P100 notes in circulation, out of a total circulation of £P40.6 million in notes and £P1.5 million in coins.

See also
 British currency in the Middle East
 Economy of Israel
 Economy of the Palestinian territories
 Economy of Jordan

References

 
 
 
 Memorandum relating to currency arrangements. In: Official Gazette of the Government of Palestine, 9. 1927, no. 182 (1.03.1927), pp. 131–134.
 Currency Notes Ordinance 1927. In: Official Gazette of the Government of Palestine, 9. 1927, no. 184 (1.04.1927), pp. 249–252.
 Palestine Currency Order 1927. In: Official Gazette of the Government of Palestine, 9. 1927, no. 193 (16.08.1927), pp. 590–592.
 Notice: Palestine Currency. In: Official Gazette of the Government of Palestine, 9. 1927, no. 197 (16.10.1927), pp. 726–727.

External links

Currencies of the British Empire
Currencies of Israel
Currencies of Jordan
Modern obsolete currencies
Mandatory Palestine
1927 establishments in Mandatory Palestine
1950 disestablishments in Israel